Terra X is a brand used by the German public broadcaster ZDF since 2008. Between 1982 and 2008, the brand name was ZDF Expedition. Some topics under the brand Terra X are documentaries about history, nature, archaeology and science. The documentaries are broadcast on ZDF. Repeats are also broadcast on ZDFinfo, ZDFneo, Phoenix, Arte and 3sat.

Background 
On 17 January 1982, the first ZDF Expedition documentary was broadcast. In 2008, the name was changed to Terra X. The brand includes documentary series, where a topic will be covered deeper than in usual documentaries. Since the mid 1980s simulations of the past are included for visualization and since the 1990s some historical events are re-enacted with actors.

Over 40 documentaries are produced per year under the brand of Terra X. The average cost of a 45-minute-film amounts to €250,000. The documentaries of Terra X are sold and broadcast internationally, for example in National Geographic Channel in the United States.

Terra X is also active on the internet. Beside the ZDF video on demand platform ZDFmediathek, they are publishing documentaries and clips on platforms like YouTube. The Terra X Lesch & Co channel presented by Harald Lesch was launched on 3 February 2016. Later that year, their YouTube channel Terra X Natur & Geschichte started on 15 August, where Terra X is publishing full documentaries that are also airing on TV. During the COVID-19 pandemic, Terra X started the YouTube channel Terra X statt Schule (Terra X Instead of School), where they are publishing different knowledge videos of content that has been already broadcast. In 2019, Terra X published some clips about the topic climate under CC BY 4.0, so that the clips can be also used in Wikipedia.

References

External links 
 
 Terra X at ZDFmediathek

ZDF original programming
German documentary television series
1982 German television series debuts
1980s German television series
1990s German television series
2000s German television series
2010s German television series
2020s German television series